In 2020, there were thirty-eight new This American Life episodes.

Air Date: 2020-01-10

Air Date: 2020-01-31

Air Date: 2020-02-07

Air Date: 2020-02-14

Air Date: 2020-02-28

Air Date: 2020-03-13

Air Date: 2020-03-20

Air Date: 2020-03-27

Air Date: 2020-04-03

Air Date: 2020-04-10

Air Date: 2020-04-17

Air Date: 2020-04-24

Air Date: 2020-05-08

Air Date: 2020-05-15

Air Date: 2020-05-22

Air Date: 2020-05-29

Air Date: 2020-06-05

Air Date: 2020-06-12

Air Date: 2020-06-26

Air Date: 2020-07-10

Air Date: 2020-07-17

Air Date: 2020-07-31

Air Date: 2020-08-07

Air Date: 2020-08-14

Air Date: 2020-08-28

Air Date: 2020-09-04

Air Date: 2020-09-11

Air Date: 2020-09-25, an update of episode 

Air Date: 2020-10-02

Air Date: 2020-10-16

Air Date: 2020-10-23

Air Date: 2020-10-30

Air Date: 2020-11-06

Air Date: 2020-11-13

Air Date: 2020-11-27

Air Date: 2020-12-11

Air Date: 2020-12-18

Air Date: 2020-12-25

References

External links
This American Lifes radio archive for 2020

2020
This American Life
This American Life